The 2007 Premier League speedway season was the second division of speedway in the United Kingdom and governed by the Speedway Control Bureau (SCB), in conjunction with the British Speedway Promoters' Association (BSPA).

Season summary
The League consisted of 15 teams for the 2007 season with the addition of the Birmingham Brummies from the 2006 season.

The top four teams at the time of the fixture cut-off date to compete for the championship in the play-offs. Birmingham Brummies were in fifth place at the time of the fixture cut-off date, therefore the Isle of Wight Islanders qualified for the play-offs. Teams finishing in fifth to twelfth at the time of the fixture cut-off date compete in the Young Shield.

Rye House Rockets won the title.

Final table

*Birmingham Brummies were in fifth place at the time of the fixture cut-off date, therefore the Isle of Wight Islanders qualified for the play-offs.

Play-offs
Aggregate scores over two legs.

Semi-finals
Rye House Rockets 105-75 Isle of Wight Islanders
Sheffield Tigers 99-86 King's Lynn Stars

Final
Rye House Rockets 111-74 Sheffield Tigers

Premier League Knockout Cup
The 2007 Premier League Knockout Cup was the 40th edition of the Knockout Cup for tier two teams. King's Lynn Stars were the winners of the competition for the third successive year.

First round

Quarter-finals

Semi-finals

Final
First leg

Second leg

King's Lynn were declared Knockout Cup Champions, winning on aggregate 105–78.

Final leading averages

Riders & final averages
Berwick

Michal Makovský 7.56
Stanisław Burza 7.27
Jacek Rempala 7.07
Andreas Bergstrom 6.41
Sebastian Truminski 6.31
Michael Coles 4.59
David Meldrum 4.56
Benji Compton 3.30
Jamie Robertson 3.29
Sam Martin 2.60

Birmingham

Jason Lyons 9.68
Ulrich Ostergaard 8.80 
Henning Bager 7.85
Phil Morris 7.26
Emiliano Sanchez 7.03
Manuel Hauzinger 6.86
Henrik Moller 6.54
Ben Powell 5.75
Lee Smart 5.13
Brent Werner 4.70
Aidan Collins 4.59
Jon Armstrong 4.36

Edinburgh

Kaj Laukkanen 8.50
Ronnie Correy 8.17
George Štancl 7.63
Matthew Wethers 7.50
William Lawson 7.41
Henrik Møller 7.10
Theo Pijper 6.47
Derek Sneddon 6.39
Daniele Tessari 5.60
Andrew Tully 5.46
Kalle Katajisto 1.60

Glasgow

Shane Parker 10.03
Craig Watson 8.43
George Štancl 8.09
Trent Leverington 6.81
Robert Ksiezak 6.27
David McAllan 5.94
Lee Dicken 5.33
Lee Smethills 4.30
Michael Coles 3.88

Isle of Wight

Chris Holder 10.69
Jason Bunyan 8.60
Krzysztof Stojanowski 7.57
Glen Phillips 7.04
Cory Gathercole 6.36
Chris Johnson 5.28
Andrew Bargh 3.97

King's Lynn

Daniel Nermark 10.00
Tomáš Topinka 9.78
Paul Lee 7.41
Trevor Harding 7.22
Chris Mills 7.13
James Brundle 5.97
Simon Lambert 5.31
Adam Allott 4.85
Benji Compton 3.50

Mildenhall

Kyle Legault 8.53
Marián Jirout 7.09
Tom P. Madsen 7.01
Paul Fry 6.43
Tomáš Suchánek 6.37
Shaun Tacey 6.29
Jason King 6.24
Mark Baseby 3.77
Mark Thompson 2.68

Newcastle

Josef Franc 8.42
Christian Henry 8.36 
Carl Wilkinson 7.04
Jonas Raun 6.11
Ross Brady 5.96
Sean Stoddart 4.84
Paul Clews 4.80
Ashley Johnson 1.71
Sam Dore 1.33

Newport

Phil Morris 6.85
Tony Atkin 6.82
Chris Schramm 6.80
Michał Rajkowski 6.68
Sebastian Truminski 6.25
Tom Hedley 5.93
Nick Simmons 4.79
Barry Burchatt 4.71
Karl Mason 2.06

Redcar

Gary Havelock 9.84
James Grieves 9.09
Robbie Kessler 8.36
Josh Auty 7.28
Mathieu Trésarrieu 7.15
Chris Kerr 6.58
Daniel Giffard 4.46
Jamie Courtney 3.39
Jack Hargreaves 3.04
Rusty Hodgson 2.14
Arlo Bugeja 1.60

Rye House

Tai Woffinden 9.01 
Stefan Ekberg 8.98
Stuart Robson 8.68
Chris Neath 8.62
Steve Boxall 8.38 
Tommy Allen 7.67 
Adam Roynon 7.24
Robbie Kessler 6.49
Luke Bowen 4.98

Sheffield

Andre Compton 10.43 
Ricky Ashworth 8.50 
Ben Wilson 7.48
Joel Parsons 6.32
Paul Cooper 6.30
James Birkinshaw 5.92
James Cockle 4.27

Somerset

Magnus Zetterström 10.79
Emil Kramer 8.60 
Ritchie Hawkins 6.36
Simon Walker 5.92
Jordan Frampton 5.62
Stephan Katt 5.20
Danny Warwick 5.12
Tomáš Suchánek 3.90

Stoke

Glenn Cunningham 7.60
Lee Complin 7.47
Rusty Harrison 7.11
Claus Vissing 6.87
Garry Stead 6.75
Ben Barker 6.69
Barrie Evans 5.26
Jack Hargreaves 4.37

Workington

James Wright 9.53
Carl Stonehewer 9.32
Ulrich Ostergaard 8.83
Kauko Nieminen 8.72
Craig Branney 6.16
Jamie Robertson 4.28
Charles Wright 4.18
Mattia Carpanese 4.15
John Branney 3.97

See also
List of United Kingdom Speedway League Champions
Knockout Cup (speedway)

References

Speedway Premier League
Premier League
Speedway Premier League